Romania were represented by 33 athletes at the 2010 European Athletics Championships held in Barcelona, Spain.

Participants

Results

References 
 Participants list

2010
Nations at the 2010 European Athletics Championships
European Athletics Championships